The Fair Grounds Racing Hall of Fame was created in 1971 by the Fair Grounds Race Course in New Orleans, Louisiana, to honor the horses and people who have played a significant part in the history of the racecourse.

Inductees

References

Horse racing museums and halls of fame
Fair Grounds Race Course
Horse racing in New Orleans
1971 establishments in Louisiana
Halls of fame in Louisiana
Equestrian museums in the United States
Museums in New Orleans
Awards established in 1971